Abhilash Pillai (born 17 May 1969) is an Indian theatre director, both pedagogue and scholar of contemporary Indian theatre.

Early life and education
Abhilash Pillai was born on 17 May 1969 at Trivandrum to S. R. K. Pillai and Sarada Pillai. In 1991, he completed his Bachelor of Theatre Arts from The School of Drama, University of Calicut and secured third rank. He also completed a three-year Postgraduate Diploma in Dramatics with a specialization in Design and Direction from the National School of Drama, New Delhi, with distinction in 1994. He then obtained a two-year diploma in Theatre Production and Stage Management with honors from the Royal Academy of Dramatic Arts, London in 1998. He also did a one-year intensive training in advanced theatre direction in association with eminent directors in the Orange Tree Theatre, United Kingdom during 1998 and 1999 and attained his PhD from Jawaharlal Nehru University, New Delhi in 2012.

Career
Pillai began his career in theatre as an artistic director at the Abhinaya Theatre and Research Centre, Thiruvananthapuram (Trivandrum) in Kerala. He worked there from September 1999 to April 2001. Later, he was appointed as an assistant professor at National School of Drama, New Delhi and rose to become the dean of academics from July 2008 to June 2011 and  2019 to 2021.  In 2016 he became an associate professor at the National School of Drama. Presently, he is a visiting faculty/play director at many universities in India and abroad. He is also the chairman of Arnav Art Trust since 2011 and a committee member of Natrang Pratishtan, New Delhi.  He works as a professor at National School of Drama and he is also executive director of the Asia Theatre Education Center (ATEC) Central Academy Of Drama, Beijing, China

Major directorial works

As an actor
1987 – Indrajith in Lanka Lakshmi of C. N. Sreekantan Nair, directed by Krishnan Namboodiri
1988 – Carpenter in Andorra authored by Max Frisch, directed by Ashoken, Thrissur School of Drama
1988 – Common-man in Mahendra Varman's Mathavilasam directed by Kavalam Narayana Panicker
1989 – Curtain-holder in Pancharatra of Bhasa, under the direction of B. V. Karanth
1990 – Third Son in Bhasa's Madhyama Vyayoga, directed by Rajendren Thayattu

Awards
 2003 – National Sanskriti Award 2002–03 (National Cultural Award) for achievements in theatre in December 2003 by Sanskriti Pratishtan, New Delhi
 2012 – Kerala Sangeetha Nataka Akademi Award for Theatre Direction
 2013 – Rangkarmee Ram Vinay Rang Samman from Ashirwad Rangmandal, Begusarai, Bihar.
 2013 - Dr.  Vayala Vasudevan Pillai  Award For Contribution in Theatre Performance by Kanal Samskarika Vedhi |Kanal Samskarika Vedhi of Kerala University.
 2018 - Badal Sarkar Award For Contribution in Theatre, The Fact Art And Culture Society, Bihar.
 2021 - Dr. Taranikanta Roy Award For Contribution in Theatre Direction by Asom Natya Sanmilan| Asom Natya Sanmilan, Assam.

References 

Indian theatre directors
Living people
Theatre practitioners
Indian drama teachers
National School of Drama alumni
1969 births
Recipients of the Kerala Sangeetha Nataka Akademi Award